Bog Creek Farm, located in Howell Township, New Jersey, is a designated Environmental Protection Agency (EPA) Superfund site. Lying on 12 acres of land, Bog Creek Farm is home to several hazardous and life-threatening contamination beginning in 1973 and continuing for a year. Over a decade later, actions began to take place to clean and restore the contaminated soil and water. Bog Creek Farm is situated near several other farms that house horses, growing crops and flowers, and livestock. Less than a mile down the road lies Allaire State Park, a park used by golfers, hunters, and fisherman.

Origins
Located in Howell Township, Bog Creek farm contains a pond, trench, and bog on a 12-acre lot of land on Monmouth County RT 547. It is best known as Squankum Road, in Howell Township, New Jersey. In the early 1970s, it started to become contaminated with a large amount of harmful chemicals, which would be later be evaporated into our atmosphere, potentially harming those breathing in the toxic air. Paint manufactures are to blame for the contamination of the area.

Town history
Howell Township, New Jersey is home to Bog Creek Farm. It was named after New Jersey's third governor, Richard Howell. This township was created in 1801, after Shrewsbury Township sectioned off a portion of their own land to create a new township. Outside of being known for Bog Creek Farm, Howell  is most notable for being the set of the 2005 movie, War of the Worlds. As recently as June 2017, Howell Township made the news, when two isolated tornadoes struck the town- just minutes apart from each other- leaving several business, houses, and parks damaged.

Company history 
Frederick Barry, Margaret M Barry, and Samuel Khaudary, the owners of the paint manufacturing company “Western Ranch Corporation”, are the notable people ultimately to blame for the toxic dumping at Bog Creek farm. The parts of the property that were affected were the ground water, surface water, waste and soil. Elements dumped contained lacquer thinner, paint solvent, resins, animal carcasses, residual debris, VOC's and heavy metals. These contaminants were dumped in the disposal area between the years of 1973 to 1974.

Superfund designation
After seeing the health impact of those residing in the surrounding areas, State and Federal action was taken nearly a decade after the contamination began. A cleanup effort has taken effect that still remains to date.

State intervention
The state of New Jersey made the decision to take action in the mid-1980s, more than a decade after the damage began, although Bog Creek Farm was listed as a Superfund site in 1983. The property owners Frederick and Margaret Barry and Samuel Khaudary were directed to remove partial waste and cover the trench. Directions came shortly after on-site toxicity was brought to the attention of the Howell Township Health Department, located in Howell, New Jersey, by the property owners. It then became a national issue when EPA came up with a plan to clean the area with three major aquifers in September 1985.

National intervention 
The control of contamination and its source was elected in September 1985 by EPA's Record of Decision. However, in 1984, EPA installed test pits, trenches, and wells on site to determine the extent of contamination. The site was addressed through the actions of Federal agents. EPA's involvement discovered the disposal area of 4 acres; about a third of the size of the 12-acre area. The site owners pumped the contaminated waste into landfills approved by the EPA.

Health and environmental hazards
Due to the high amount of contamination in the on-site groundwater, surface water, waste, sediment, and soil there are several health and environmental hazards. Infections, reactions, and disorders have been detected in pollution victims via contaminants detected in a laboratory. Groundwater, waste, and surface water contaminants included, but are not limited to benzene, chloroform, ethyl benzene, methylene chloride, dichlorobenzene, dichloromethane, methyl phenol, trichloroethane, toluene, and xylenes. The on-site soil contained chlordane, chromium, lead, and PCB-1242. Sediment was contaminated with benzene, bis phthalate, heptachlor, toluene, and total xylenes. Environmental pathways began to migrate off-site via wind and water, effecting more than on-site life. Due to the unrestricted area the site lies on, hunting may be conducted on Bog Creek Farm. Contaminated food-chain entities that have been hunted have the potential to expose humans to the toxicity of the area.

Water contamination
Water carried though to Squankum Brook took a toll on the town's residents. In the short term, victims may suffer respiratory tract infection, visual disorders, skin reactions, nausea, and fatigue. However, in the long run, those victims may experience damage to liver, kidneys, and central nervous system.

Land contamination
Ground water, surface water, waste soil and sediment has the ability to cause harm to those who come in contact with the contaminated element. Such hazardous materials have the potential to be absorbed by the skin, inhaled, or ingested, leading to further health issues.

Other contaminants 
Lacquer thinners, paint solvents, animal carcasses, residential debris, VOC's, heavy metals, resins, and disinfectants evaporated into the air, polluting the air inhaled by not only humans, but animals as well. This has had a huge impact on the 900 people, crops, agriculture and livestock residing within one mile of the Superfund site Bog Creek Farm.

Cleanup
18,000 tons of contaminated soil was removed from the site to date. Removal and treatment of 6.5 million galled of contaminated groundwater have been conducted just in 2017. Human exposure is kept to a minimum with the best effort of the EPA.

Initial cleanup
Starting in 1985, cleanup was directed by EPA standards. The removal of wastewater from the bog and pond was the initial step. EPA continued on the restructuring and covering both the pond and bog. Using an on-site plant, clean water was discharged to nearby stream after the wastewater was treated. Several reviews were set up, such as a 5-year and 10-year review, to monitor and assess the effectiveness of the method of clean up. A security fence was placed around the work areas to ensure proper reliability of the controlled cleanup strategy. EPA conducted an investigation to reduce the amount and source of contamination at Bog Creek Farm.

Current status
Groundwater treatment in Bog Creek Farm is currently ongoing. Groundwater is extracted, treated, and re-injected using an on-site treatment method. This method is used to restore water resources in the Upper Kirkwood Aquifer. Contaminated sediments are also being cleaned up from the North Branch of Squankum Brook via manual digging up and incinerating. Operating continuously, the treatment system for the water at Bog Creek Farm treats nearly one million gallons of contaminated water, then re-injects the clean water, each month.

References

External links

Superfund sites in New Jersey
Howell Township, New Jersey